Sharifoba may refer to:
Şərifoba, Azerbaijan
Yeni Şərif, Azerbaijan